Ole Vatnan (born 20 August 1927) is a Norwegian civil servant.

He was born in Fauske, Salten, and graduated as cand.oecon. in 1952. In 1961 he was hired in the Ministry of Transport and Communications, being promoted to deputy under-secretary of state in 1969. From 1974 he served as director of the newly created Norwegian Coastal Administration. He retired in 1995.

References

1927 births
Possibly living people
People from Fauske
Norwegian civil servants
Directors of government agencies of Norway